Fratelli Bandiera was the lead ship of her class of four submarines built for the  (Royal Italian Navy) during the late 1920s.

Design and description
The Bandiera class was an improved and enlarged version of the preceding s. They displaced  surfaced and  submerged. Their crew numbered 53 officers and enlisted men.

For surface running, the boats were powered by two  diesel engines, each driving one propeller shaft. When submerged each propeller was driven by a  electric motor. They could reach  on the surface and  underwater.

The boats were armed with eight  torpedo tubes, four each in the bow and stern for which they carried a total of 12 torpedoes. They were also armed with a single  deck gun forward of the conning tower for combat on the surface. Their anti-aircraft armament consisted of two  machine guns.

Construction and career
Fratelli Bandiera was laid down by Cantiere Navale Triestino at their Trieste shipyard in 1928, launched on 7 August 1929 and completed later that year.

Notes

References

External links
 Classe Bandiera Marina Militare website

Bandiera-class submarines
World War II submarines of Italy
1929 ships